Lexington is a ghost town in Clark County, Kansas, United States.

History
A post office was established in Lexington in the 1880s, and remained in operation until it was discontinued in 1927.

References

Further reading

Unincorporated communities in Clark County, Kansas
Unincorporated communities in Kansas